The 1935 Manhattan Jaspers football team was an American football team that represented Manhattan College as an independent during the 1935 college football season.  In its fourth season under head coach Chick Meehan, the team compiled a 5–3–1 record and outscored opponents by a total of 248 to 117.  The team's starting backfield consisted of Jim Downey, John Zuck, Jim Whalen, and Red Welch.

Schedule

References

Manhattan
Manhattan Jaspers football seasons
Manhattan Jaspers football
1930s in Brooklyn
Flatbush, Brooklyn